| country              = United States
| num_episodes         = 9
| network              = VH1
| first_aired          = 
| last_aired           = 
| episode_list = List of Basketball Wives episodes
}}
The first season of the reality television series Basketball Wives aired on VH1 from April 11, 2010 until June 20, 2010. The show was primarily filmed in Miami, Florida. It was executively produced by Nick Emmerson
Alex Demyanenko, Shaunie O'Neal, Jill Holmes, Tom Huffman, and Sean Rankine.

The show chronicles the lives of a group of women who are the wives and girlfriends, or have been romantically linked to, professional basketball players in the National Basketball Association, though the title of the series does not make this differentiation, solely referring to the women as "wives".

Production
Basketball Wives debuted on April 11, 2010, with thirty-minute episodes. The first season followed the lives of Royce Reed former cheerleader of Orlando and Miami, Suzie Ketcham ex-girlfriend of Michael Olowokandi, Gloria Govan fiancée of Matt Barnes, Jennifer Williams wife of Eric Williams, Evelyn Lozada fiancee of Antoine Walker, and Shaunie O'Neal wife of Shaquille O'Neal. With Erika Moxxam joining the recurring cast.

Cast

Main cast
 Royce Reed: Ex-Dancer for Miami Heat & Orlando Magic
 Suzie Ketcham: Ex-Girlfriend of Michael Olowokandi
 Gloria Govan: Fiancée of Matt Barnes
 Jennifer Williams: Wife of Eric Williams
 Evelyn Lozada: Ex-Fiancée of Antoine Walker
Shaunie O'Neal: Wife of Shaquille O’Neal

Recurring cast
Erikka Moxam: Ex-Girlfriend of Rasual Butler

Episodes

References

2010 American television seasons
Basketball Wives